Kidnapped is a 1917 American silent adventure film directed by Alan Crosland for Edison Studios. It was based on the 1886 novel Kidnapped by Robert Louis Stevenson. The film only included selected parts of the story, and reinforced the then-developing romanticisation of the Scottish Highlands.

Previously thought lost, a copy of the film is preserved in the Library of Congress collection, with a 2017 DVD of the film being released with the help of the Library of Congress and crowdfunding.

Cast
Raymond McKee as David Balfour
Joseph Burke as Ebenezer Balfour
Ray Hallor as Ransome
William Wadsworth as Angus Ban Keillor
Robert Cain as Alan Breck
Walter Craven as Riach
John Nicholson as Shuan
Franklyn Hanna as Captain Hoseason (*Franklin Farnum)
Samuel N. Niblack as Cluny McPherson (*as Samuel Niblack)
Horace Haine as Colin Campbell (*as Horace Hane)
James Levering as Minister

References

External links

1917 films
American silent feature films
American black-and-white films
Films based on Kidnapped (novel)
Films directed by Alan Crosland
1910s rediscovered films
Films set in Scotland
1910s historical drama films
American historical drama films
1917 drama films
Rediscovered American films
1910s American films
Silent American drama films
Silent adventure films